The Influence is a 2019 Spanish horror film directed by Denis Rovira van Boekholt in his feature directorial debut. The film stars Manuela Vellés, Alain Hernández, Maggie Civantos and Claudia Placer. The film is based on the adaptation from a novel with the same title The Influence, written by popular English novelist Ramsey Campbell in 1988. The film was streamed via Netflix on 11 October 2019 and opened to mixed reviews from critics.

Synopsis 
Alicia (Manuela Vellés) has returned to the family home which she fled as a child. Along with her husband, Mikel (Alain Hernández) and her nine-year-old daughter, Nora (Claudia Placer), Alicia seeks to rebuild her life while being forced to confront a past she believed forgotten and a body that refuses to die: that of Victoria (Emma Suárez), the possessive family matriarch who has fallen into a deep coma and barely survives on life support.

Cast 

 Manuela Vellés as Alicia
 Alain Hernández as Mikel
 Maggie Civantos as Sara
 Claudia Placer as Nora
 Emma Suárez as Victoria
 Daniela Rubin as Luna
 Mariana Cordero as Mejido
 Carlos Cuevas as Fran
 Felipe García Vélez as Tio Pedro
 Marta Castellote as Ana
 Ramón Esquinas as Abuelo
 David Luque as Notario

References

External links 
 
 

Spanish-language Netflix original films
2019 horror films
2010s Spanish-language films
Films about witchcraft
Films about Satanism
Gothic horror films
Spanish ghost films
Spanish horror films
2019 films
Spanish supernatural horror films
2010s Spanish films